In April 2022, a no-confidence motion against Imran Khan led to his removal as the prime minister of Pakistan. Based largely on the Westminster system of legislature, the prime minister commands confidence of the majority of the lower house of Parliament, the National Assembly of Pakistan, under clause (2A) of Article 91 of the Constitution. Numerous opposition parties joined forces to file the motion of no confidence against Imran Khan in the National Assembly. It ultimately led to the removal of Khan from office as a majority passed the motion in the Lower House.

The decision to file a no-confidence motion against sitting prime minister Imran Khan of Pakistan Tehreek-e-Insaf (PTI) – who had held the position since the 2018 election – was taken at a summit of the opposition parties, united under the Pakistan Democratic Movement (PDM) alliance. Speaking at a joint press conference, the then-Leader of the Opposition Shehbaz Sharif said the motion was presented because of the government's poor performance in economic and social indicators during the four years of Khan's ministry. In the leadup to the no-confidence motion, Khan's PTI also faced defections from some lawmakers within its own ranks, which emboldened the opposition's move to file the motion.

On 8 March 2022, representatives of opposition parties filed the motion against Khan in the National Assembly, seeking to remove him from office, while accusing his alleged hybrid regime of poor governance, political victimisation of opponents, and mismanaging the economy and foreign policy. It is alleged that these factors also contributed to Khan's falling out with Pakistan's military establishment, which had remained a key backer of his government.

Khan claimed that he possessed a diplomatic cable dated 7 March, in which a "threat" was issued by the US government stating their desire to see Khan's ousting from office, with the stipulation that Pakistan would be "forgiven" if the motion against him succeeded. The US was allegedly unhappy with Khan's foreign policy and his visit to Russia. Khan alleged that the United States was behind a "foreign conspiracy" to oust him in a regime change, and that he had written evidence attesting to this. These allegations were denied by the US government. Imran Khan also said that he has been punished on not accepting U.S. policy after withdrawal from Afghanistan. Donald Lu, US Assistant Secretary of State for Central and South Asia evaded the question regarding his meeting with Pakistan's Ambassador to the U.S. Khan's party alleged that there is a close connection between regime changes after UN's Ukraine Resolution. Russian Ministry of Foreign Affairs Spokesperson Maria Zakharova said that the U.S. has punished disobedient Imran Khan and termed that interference a shameless act. However, U.S. said that there is "absolutely no truth" in the allegations.

On 3 April 2022, the motion of no confidence was unilaterally dismissed by the deputy speaker, Qasim Khan Suri, without putting the motion to a vote in the National Assembly, on grounds of "foreign interference". Bilawal Bhutto Zardari, chairman of the opposition Pakistan Peoples Party (PPP), announced challenging the ruling in the Supreme Court of Pakistan: "Our lawyers are on their way to Supreme Court. We call on all institutions to protect, uphold, defend and implement the constitution of Pakistan," he wrote.

With the motion set aside, and invoking his powers as prime minister, Khan advised president Arif Alvi to dissolve the National Assembly and called for fresh general elections, an act on which the Supreme Court took suo moto notice of the ensuing constitutional crisis. The development came after the opposition leaders demanded to review the “unconstitutional” ruling given by National Assembly Deputy Speaker Qasim Suri. The Supreme Court, with a 5–0 vote, ruled that the deputy speaker's ruling to dismiss the motion and the subsequent dissolution of the National Assembly were unconstitutional, thus allowing the no-confidence vote to proceed. On 10 April, the no-confidence motion passed with a majority of 174 votes (out of 342) in the National Assembly, which resulted in Khan losing the confidence of the house and ceasing to hold the office of prime minister. Thus, Khan became the first Pakistani prime minister to lose a no-confidence vote. Later, Khan called for mass rallies against his removal and the new government.

On 11 April, Shehbaz Sharif was elected unopposed by the National Assembly to replace Khan as prime minister, as Khan's PTI party boycotted the vote and resigned en masse from the National Assembly. Sharif's cabinet, comprising 37 members, took oath on 19 April.

Khan accuses United States of a regime change.

Background

Under Article 58 of the constitution of Pakistan, a Prime Minister ceases to hold office if the majority of members of the National Assembly, equating to 172 members (out of 342), vote in favour of no-confidence. A successful vote means that cabinet would also be dissolved. When the motion is successful, a new prime minister is elected by the house, for which both the ruling party and opposition usually submit nomination papers of their chosen candidates.

At the time of the motion of no confidence, Pakistan Tehreek-e-Insaf (PTI), the ruling party led by the prime minister, had a centrist coalition government, with 176 members on the treasury seats, while the combined number of opposition seats stood at 162. The total votes required to remove the prime minister are 172. Once a no-confidence motion is submitted, the Speaker must call the house to order within two weeks, and voting must take place on the motion within one week after the house is called in order.

No prime minister in Pakistan has previously been removed through a motion of no-confidence. A vote of no confidence against the premier has been tabled on two occasions before. In 1989, Benazir Bhutto survived a vote of no confidence. In 2006, Shaukat Aziz also survived a motion against him when the opposition was able to muster only 136 votes, short of the required simple majority of 172.

On 11 February 2022, Fazal-ur-Rehman, president of the Pakistan Democratic Movement, announced his intent to bring a vote of no confidence. The announcement came after a meeting of PDM's parliamentary parties. The opposition parties also decided to contact the incumbent government allies to convince them to join the vote of no confidence. The announcement came after the Pakistan Peoples Party, led by former president Asif Ali Zardari and his son Bilawal Bhutto Zardari, met Pakistan Muslim League (N)'s Shehbaz Sharif, who is Leader of the Opposition in the National Assembly, along with his niece and daughter of three-time former prime minister Nawaz Sharif, Maryam Nawaz.

In response, the federal Minister for Information, Fawad Chaudhry, accused the opposition of corruption and termed the opposition's no-confidence move a ploy to turn attention away from corruption cases that many of the opposition leaders were facing due to the charges levied against them by the National Accountability Bureau.

Vote of no-confidence
The constitution of Pakistan allows for the removal of an incumbent prime minister if a no-confidence motion gains a simple majority. If parliament is not in session, opposition parties must also requisition the Speaker of the National Assembly to summon a session; once the requisition is submitted, the speaker has a maximum of 14 days to summon the session. Once the session is in attendance, the secretary of the house will circulate the motion for the no-confidence vote, which in this instance was moved to the next working day.

Once the motion is moved, according to the rules of procedure, it cannot be voted up before three days or after seven days. The vote is conducted by an open vote by division, once the session takes place, a bell is rung to inform any parliamentarians that might be outside the assembly hall; later, the gates are closed. Those in favour of no-confidence exit the hall from one side, those not in favour exit the hall from another side; once the members of the assembly begin to leave, the counting procedure starts, everyone re-enters the hall once the hall is emptied and all members have displayed their vote by exiting the hall.

After the vote is complete, if the no-confidence motion is successful, the speaker of the house informs the president of Pakistan in writing and secretary issues a notification to the gazette.

Events prior to vote

Parliament Lodges incident
On 9 March 2022, members of Jamiat Ulema-e-Islam (F)'s Ansar-ul-Islam, a uniform volunteer force entered Parliament Lodges. Jamiat Ulema-e-Islam (F) maintained that force will remain inside the lodges until the no-confidence motion was passed.

On 10 March 2022, Islamabad Police conducted an operation inside Parliament Lodges and arrested 19 people, including JUI-F MNAs Maulana Salahuddin Ayyubi and Muhammad Jamal ud Din for bringing Ansar-ul-Islam's workers in the Parliament Lodges.
Islamabad Inspector General of Police Muhammad Ahsan Younas suspended the officers in charge of D-Chowk under whose supervision Ansar-ul-Islam workers had entered the Parliament lodges.

Senator Kamran Murtaza along with other lawyers submitted the petition to the police station secretariat. The petition said that the policemen tortured them including Saad Rafiq, Syed Rafiullah and others, while the police did not have arrest warrants or the permission of the speaker.

The united opposition filed a privilege motion in the National Assembly against the operation, adding that a large contingent of police had infiltrated and the members of the National Assembly were arrested, beaten and their doors smashed.

Interior Minister Sheikh Rasheed Ahmad said that JUI-F's MNA Salahuddin Ayubi was not arrested, only 20 people of the “militia” involved in creating unrest at the lodges were arrested. The interior minister maintained that "it is the job of the state, not private militia to provided security to national buildings. The militia was dissolved in 2019, what you are trying to prove to bring them into the capital; we will not spare any private militia in the capital if seen in the uniform."

Sindh House protest

Before vote of no confidence opposition claimed that they have group of dissidents lawmakers of then ruling Pakistan Tehreek-e-Insaf, and they could have a successful vote of no confidence even without involving government allies. However, the government denied and said that they have their lawmakers with them, and if opposition alliance will buy any of them this will be unconstitutional. This tug of war continued until dozen government lawmakers were found in Sindh House ‘sanctuary’. The Prime minister Imran Khan, claimed that MPs are bought with bags full of cash and this is an open horse-trading. However, the dissented law markers during their interaction with media denied the allegations and said that there was no money involved.

On 18 March 2022, PTI protesters stormed Sindh House in Islamabad and broke through the gate. Workers protested and chanted slogans against deviant members of parliament. Protesters held Ewer and sticks in their hands. Police arrested 12 people, including two PTI members of the National Assembly, Faheem Khan and Attaullah Niazi. The PTI MNAs were later released on personal bail.

PPP's Yousaf Raza Gillani, Raja Pervez Ashraf and PML-N's Shahid Khaqan Abbasi said that if there was a police operation on Sindh House then Prime Minister Imran Khan and Interior Minister Sheikh Rashid would be responsible for the results. PPP chairman Bilawal Bhutto Zardari said that Prime Minister Khan was trying to prove his "third power" by creating an unstable situation through the use of force.

Allies join PDM 
On 27 March 2022, Jamhoori Watan Party's Shahzain Bugti resigned from the federal cabinet and joined forces with the PDM. On 28 March 2022, four out of five legislators of the Balochistan Awami Party, an ally party of the PTI government, announced quitting the ruling alliance in the federal government, and joined the opposition. On 30 March 2022, the Muttahida Qaumi Movement-Pakistan, another key ally of the PTI-led coalition government, formally announced that it was joining the opposition ranks. Meanwhile, MQM-P members Farogh Naseem (law minister) and Syed Aminul Haque (IT & telecommunication minister) resigned from the cabinet.

Government response to motion
As pressure for the no-confidence vote built up, the prime minister and members of his cabinet came up with a multi-prong approach to tackle public opinion and reverse the pressure on the opposition. The government has planned massive public outreach rallies to turn public opinion in its favour; at these rallies, the prime minister tackled both domestic and foreign narratives.

Dissident members of government
Some disgruntled and dissident members of the ruling party allied themselves with the opposition; according to the known dissidents, total government assembly members to vote against their party's head is between 24 and 33. While the dissenting lawmakers have been termed as 'turncoats' for money and threatened, the government has issued them show-cause notices.

On 18 March 2022, PTI workers stormed Sindh House, where most of the dissident lawmakers where staying, under the leadership of loyalist PTI lawmakers Faheem Khan and Attaullah Niazi.

Reply to opposition
While addressing a political rally at Mailsi, Prime Minister Khan called the opposition leaders as cowards and corrupt. He then went on to say that Nawaz Sharif has faked his illness to run away from Pakistan and that it was one of his biggest mistake to let Nawaz Sharif go to London. Khan also accused Shehbaz Sharif, Nawaz Sharif's brother and the leader of the opposition, as a 'boot licker', a derogatory reference to a person who makes back channel deals with the country's powerful military establishment for power. Referring to former President Asif Ali Zardari, Khan reminded the crowd that the former president was known as "Mr. 10%", and he described the former president as the biggest illness of Pakistan. Fazal-ur-Rehman, another opposition leader who is not a member of the national assembly but is the president of the opposition alliance, was termed 'Diesel', the Prime minister joking mentioned that 'the Chief of Army Staff had asked him not to call Fazal ur Rehman 'Diesel', but he couldn't do anything since the public has named him diesel already'.

Prime Minister Khan warned the opposition to be ready to face what he will do to them, the opposition, once he defeats the vote of no confidence.

Meeting with allies
On 1 March 2022, Khan met leaders of Pakistan Muslim League (Q) to discuss the political situation in the country, with the Prime Minister asking Chaudhary Shujaat Hussain to not take up the opposition's offer to join the no-confidence motion.

On 9 March 2022, the prime minister met leaders of the MQM-P, at their headquarters in Karachi MQM-P's traditional stronghold. While talking to media, MQM-P leaders mentioned that the move of no confidence was not discussed and all their options were open. On 18 March, Khalid Maqbool Siddiqui, Convener of MQM-P, said in a TV interview that Khan should resign to save the PTI government.

Amar Bil Maroof rally
On 27 March 2022, the PTI staged a political rally at the parade ground in Islamabad, which it named the "Amar Bil Maroof rally". The rally started with a speech by KP Provincial President Pervez Khattak. Sindh President Ali Zaidi, Punjab President Shafqat Mahmood and PTI Balochistan President Qasim Suri addressed the gathering. The rally was held a day before the no-confidence motion filed against him was tabled in the National Assembly.

In his address, Khan waved a letter to the people alleging that a conspiracy was being hatched to change his government with the money coming from abroad and some Pakistanis in this conspiracy unknowingly and some deliberately are being used. He further said: "We have known for months that there is a conspiracy against the government."

Allegation of foreign support for the motion

Khan and his government alleged that the United States government threatened Pakistan with 'consequences' if the vote of no-confidence were to fail and Khan were to remain in office, and that 'all would be forgiven' if Khan were removed. After he was removed from office, Khan asked US president Joe Biden, "by indulging in a regime change conspiracy to remove a democratically elected PM of a country of over 220 million people to bring in a puppet PM, do you think you have lessened or increased the anti-American sentiment in Pakistan?" Khan claimed that Nawaz Sharif and Shehbaz Sharif, leaders of the Pakistan Muslim League (N), and Asif Ali Zardari, president of the Pakistan Peoples Party, were also part of the conspiracy.

The basis of it was a diplomatic cable sent by Pakistan's ambassador to the US, Asad Majeed Khan, after his meeting with US State Department official Donald Lu in early March. White House Communications Director Kate Bedingfield responded to Khan's allegation of a conspiracy by saying "there is absolutely no truth to that allegation".

The U.S. government had supposedly been frustrated when Khan visited President Vladimir Putin in Moscow on the day of the Russian Invasion of Ukraine. Amid condemnation from European diplomats, Khan responded by saying to a public rally "Are we your slaves that we would do anything you say?" and claiming hypocrisy due to the same criticism not being given to India, who had also refused to condemn Russia's invasion. Deputy Speaker of the National Assembly Qasim Khan Suri would ultimately use this reason to unilaterally dismiss the motion of no confidence.

Pakistan's military, while terming the contents of the cable as containing "undiplomatic language", disagreed on whether there had been a foreign conspiracy. The military also publicly maintained that its stance on the political crisis was apolitical. The Pakistani government delivered a diplomatic démarche to the US government protesting against the alleged interference.

Russia supported Khan's claims and slammed the US for the alleged interference in Pakistan's affairs for its "own selfish purposes".

On 23 May 2022, Khan suggested that US State Department official Donald Lu be fired for interfering with Pakistan's domestic politics and "for bad manners and sheer arrogance." Khan added, "I had perfectly good relationship with the Trump administration. It's only when the Biden administration came, and it coincided with what was happening in Afghanistan. And for some reason, which I still don't know, they never got in touch with me."

Constitutional crisis 

In an address to the nation on 3 April 2022, Prime Minister Khan announced that he had advised President Arif Alvi to dissolve assemblies following the dismissal of the no-confidence motion. Hence, on the same day, the president dissolved the National Assembly on the prime minister's advice under Article 58 of the Constitution.

On the same day, the Supreme Court of Pakistan (SCP) took a suo moto of the ongoing situation and a three-member bench of the supreme court heard the case. On 7 April 2022, the dismissal of the no-confidence motion without a vote and the subsequent dissolution of the National Assembly was ruled unconstitutional by the supreme court.

The SCP ordered that the National Assembly session be reconvened at no later than 10:30 a.m. on 9 April and may not be prorogued until the no-confidence vote is held.

Afterwards, Khan said he accepted the court's decision but urged people to come out and protest against what he called an "imported government".

National Assembly proceedings 
 25 March 2022: The session of parliament started and after prayer for deceased parliamentarians, National Assembly Speaker Asad Qaisar immediately adjourned the session till 28 March 2022 in accordance with parliamentary convention.
 28 March 2022: After 161 lawmakers had voted in favour of tabling of the resolution, Leader of the Opposition Shehbaz Sharif tabled the no-confidence motion against Khan. Subsequently, the deputy speaker adjourned the session until 4:00 pm on 31 March.
 31 March 2022: The National Assembly session to debate the no-confidence motion against Khan was adjourned till 11:30 am on 3 April 2022, minutes after it began.
 3 April 2022: National Assembly Deputy Speaker Qasim Khan Suri dismissed the no-confidence motion against Imran Khan, stating that it was against Article 5 of the Constitution which pledges "loyalty to the State". Suri cited "foreign interference" in his ruling to dismiss the motion.
 9 April 2022: A meeting of the National Assembly was called and held around 12:00 pm. During the day, the session was adjourned thrice amid filibustering by members of the treasury benches. Thus, the no-confidence motion was not immediately put to vote in the National Assembly. Minutes before midnight, Speaker Asad Qaiser resigned from his position. Moments before midnight, Ayaz Sadiq laid out the no-confidence motion in the National Assembly. At midnight, the National Assembly was adjourned to meet on 12:02 AM on 10 April 2022.
 10 April 2022: The no-confidence motion passes with 174 votes, a majority in the National Assembly, which resulted in Imran Khan losing the confidence of the house and ceasing to hold office of prime minister.

Aftermath

Election of a new Prime Minister
On 11 April 2022, the National Assembly held an election to decide the new prime minister. The outgoing ruling party PTI initially nominated former Foreign Minister Shah Mehmood Qureshi for the position. However, moments before the vote, the party staged a mass walkout of the Assembly in protest at what Qureshi claimed was an 'imported government'. Shehbaz Sharif, former Chief Minister of Punjab and brother of former Prime Minister Nawaz Sharif, was elected unopposed.

Public reaction
Imran Khan called for a mass rally, with PTI calling for nationwide protests on the night of Sunday, 10 April, following the events in the National Assembly. Large demonstrations were held at Karachi, Peshawar, Malakand, Multan, Khanewal, Khyber, Jhang, Quetta, Okara, Islamabad, Lahore and Abbottabad, while protests were also held at Bajaur, Lower Dir, Shangla, Kohistan, Mansehra, Swat, Gujrat, Faisalabad, Nowshera, Dera Ghazi Khan and Mandi Bahauddin. Tens of thousands of people attended the demonstrations. In Karachi, 20,000 people attended. The crowds consisted mostly of the youth of Pakistan. Journalist Haroon ur Rasheed stated that in total, 10 million (1 crore) people attended the protests. Overseas Pakistanis across the world also took part in demonstrations which occurred in Dubai, Sharjah, London and Melbourne.

On Twitter, "#Imported_Government_Rejected" trended with over 8 million tweets. Similarly, data scientist meddytweets, who had previously concluded that 76% of PML-N's vice president's Twitter followers were fake, was allegedly abducted for 13 hours and questioned on the technicalities of how "#Imported_Government_Rejected" trended. On Twitter, he said that the trend was completely organic. PTI's Dr. Shahbaz Gill alleged the PTA was slowing down internet in Islamabad to censor videos of the protests.

Anti-military backlash
A smear campaign against the Pakistan Army was taken notice of on 12 April 2022 during the 79th Formation Commanders Conference, which was held at GHQ Rawalpindi under the chairmanship of Army Chief General Qamar Javed Bajwa. In the conference, formation commanders expressed confidence in the decisions of the military leadership for upholding the constitution and law and reportedly took stern notice of the propaganda campaign against the Pakistan Army in the wake of Khan's ouster following the no-confidence motion. The Federal Investigation Agency (FIA) arrested six people allegedly involved in a well-organized campaign on social media against the Pakistan Army. By May 26, protests had escalated significantly, with the interior ministry authorizing the deployment of the army in the Red Zone.

On 9 April 2022, In the National Assembly during the voting and political turmoil on the opposition's no-confidence motion against former Prime Minister Imran Khan, in this regard, BBC Urdu reported that Imran Khan had allegedly decided to sack the army chief, Qamar Javed Bajwa, in the leadup to his government's ouster. In response, the ISPR said: "The news published in BBC Urdu is totally baseless and full of lies." It added: "This general propaganda news does not mention any credible, authoritative and relevant sources and is a violation of basic journalistic ethics. And there is no truth in this fake news and it clearly appears to be part of a systematic misinformation campaign." The ISPR stated the matter was being taken up with BBC officials.

Additionally, the hashtag "#SurrenderBajwa" also trended with hundreds of thousands of tweets. The PTI stated that the house of Dr Arsalan Khalid, former focal person to PM Imran Khan on digital media, was raided overnight, and his family's phones and laptops were confiscated. Social media influencer Waqas Amjad tweeted that the police raided both of his homes.

See also 
 Lettergate

References

2022 in Pakistani politics
March 2022 events in Pakistan
April 2022 events in Pakistan
Pakistan
Pakistan
Imran Khan administration